Paul Leonard may refer to:

 Paul Leonard (politician) (born 1943), American politician of the Ohio Democratic party
 Paul Leonard (writer), author of spin-off fiction based on Doctor Who

See also
Paul Leonard-Morgan (born 1974), Scottish composer